Oh Kwang-Jin (born 4 June 1987) is a South Korean footballer who plays as midfielder for Daegu FC.

Career
He played for Ulsan Hyundai and Gyeongnam FC but made no appearances in the top division. He moved to Korea National League side Gimhae FC in 2012.

He signed with Suwon FC after a year and a half with Gimhae. Oh made his debut for Suwon in the league match against Police FC on 6 July.

References

External links 

1987 births
Living people
Association football midfielders
South Korean footballers
Ulsan Hyundai FC players
Gyeongnam FC players
Suwon FC players
Daegu FC players
K League 1 players
Korea National League players
K League 2 players